Viipurin Palloseura (abbreviated as ViPS; 'Viipuri Ball Club') was mainly a bandy club from Vyborg, Russia (which in Finnish is called Viipuri), founded in 1928 when the town belonged to Finland. The sport came to Finland from St. Petersburg, Russia, and it was natural that it gained a strong foothold in near-by Viipuri.

During the Winter War (1939–40), the population of Viipuri was evacuated, and in the 1940 Moscow Peace Treaty the city was ceded to the Soviet Union. As a result of this, the club was in effect dissolved. A new bandy club called Hukat was formed in Helsinki, its players consisting mostly of former ViPS players.

Sporting achievements
ViPS won the Finnish championship in bandy in 1931 and 1936, silver in 1934, and bronze in 1932 and 1933.

In association football ViPS played for two seasons, in 1930–31, in the Mestaruussarja, i.e. 'Championship Series', the top flight of Finnish football.

In ice hockey the club made it to the semifinals in the season 1928–29.

ViPS in the Bandy Finnish Championship Series

Season to season in football

2 seasons in A-Sarja
7 seasons in B-Sarja
1 seasons in Piirinsarja

References 

Sports teams in Finland
Football clubs in Finland
Sport in Vyborg
Sports clubs in Helsinki
Defunct bandy clubs in Finland
Defunct football clubs in Finland
Defunct ice hockey teams in Europe
Bandy clubs established in 1928
Association football clubs established in 1928
1928 establishments in Finland